Giancarlo Dias Dantas (born 25 August 1974), commonly known as Gian, is a Brazilian former footballer.

Career statistics

Club

Notes

References

1974 births
Living people
Brazilian footballers
Brazil youth international footballers
Brazilian expatriate footballers
Association football midfielders
Association football forwards
Sociedade Esportiva Matsubara players
CR Vasco da Gama players
América Futebol Clube (RN) players
Sociedade Esportiva Matonense players
FC Luzern players
Associação Atlética Portuguesa (Santos) players
Clube do Remo players
Paysandu Sport Club players
Ceará Sporting Club players
Goiás Esporte Clube players
Campeonato Brasileiro Série A players
Swiss Super League players
Campeonato Brasileiro Série D players
Brazilian expatriate sportspeople in Switzerland
Expatriate footballers in Switzerland